Basement Crawl is an action game for PlayStation 4. It was released on February 25, 2014.

Gameplay
Basement Crawl is a maze-based action game with some strategic elements. Bloober Team's main inspirations were Spy vs. Spy and Bomberman, and gameplay revolves around setting up traps (self-detonated or activated by characters approaching it or stepping on it without noticing) to hurt other players. 
It's focused on multiplayer, but basic single player campaigns with bots to fill in for missing characters will be available too.
 
Basement Crawl is a 2.5D game with dynamic cameras – to the game modes, characters and mechanics. "We felt that many games nowadays are dependent on character development or luck and randomness, so we designed Basement Crawl to exclude the luck factor and remove the dependence on leveling-up characters. We want to make Basement Crawl as skill-based as possible and focus on hardcore players instead of casual or ‘middlecore’ players."

Basement Crawl supports both 4 player hot-seat and 8 player online play, as well as combinations of both. At the beginning, players start with a selection of 4 available characters, all with their own unique skills balanced carefully against each other. The first three characters are a midget clown, a crash-test dummy, and a girl with a bear.

Reception 

Jeremy Peeples of Hardcore Gamer gave the game a 2.5/5, criticizing it for lacking content and being too similar to Bomberman, while praising it for its basic gameplay mechanics.

In response to criticism from players and reviewers, Bloober Team announced the intention to remake the game from scratch under the title Brawl. The remake would be available free of charge to people who bought Basement Crawl.  Gamesradar ranked the game 36th on their "The 50 Worst Games of All Time."  They described the game as a boring uninspired Bomberman clone with unoriginal gameplay.

References

External links
 Bloober Team

2014 video games
Action video games
Indie video games
PlayStation 4 games
PlayStation 4-only games
PlayStation Network games
Multiplayer and single-player video games
Video games developed in Poland
Bloober Team games